N-Nitrosoglyphosate is the nitrosamine degradation product and synthetic impurity of glyphosate herbicide.

The US EPA limits N-nitrosoglyphosate impurity to a maximum of 1 ppm in glyphosate formulated products. N-Nitrosoglyphosate can also form from the reaction of nitrates and glyphosate. Formation of N-nitrosoglyphosate has been observed in soils treated with sodium nitrite and glyphosate at elevated levels, though formation in soil is not expected at under typical field conditions.

References 

Chemical substances
Herbicides
Nitrosamines